Alejo Véliz (born 19 September 2003) is a Argentine professional footballer who plays for Rosario Central.

Early life 
Alejo Véliz was born in Gödeken, a small town in the Province of Santa Fe, about 120 km from the city of Rosario. When he was only three years old, he started playing football in the club of his hometown, but aged just 6 him and his family moved to Bernardo de Irigoyen, another town in Santa Fe, where he soon started playing at the Club Unión Deportivo y Cultural, where he played with all the youth teams until he reached 16 years old.

Club career 
In late 2019 Véliz made his first trials with Rosario Central, but he only started actually playing for the club more than a year later, as youth competitions had been halted by the covid pandemic.

Alejo Véliz made his professional debut for Rosario Central on the 23 July 2021, replacing Alan Marinelli during a 1-0 home victory against the Venezuelan Deportivo Táchira, for the round of 16 of the Copa Sudamericana.

But whilst playing a few games in the Primera División that season, it was during the next one he really stood out, scoring his first goal  on the 2 May 2022 during the 2–1 away Copa de la Liga loss to Club Atlético Huracán.

He his scored his second in the next game, a 3-1 victory against Estudiantes, in a match that was also the last one of his idol and mentor, Marco Ruben, at the Rosario Central Stadium.

Alejo Véliz really made headlines on the 21 July 2022, as he scored the only goal of Rosario Central's Primera División victory against Newell's Old Boys in the historic Clásico Rosarino.

International career 
Alejo Véliz was first called to the Argentina national under-20 team by Fernando Batista in October 2021.

He was selected again by the new U20 head coach Javier Mascherano in February 2022 and during the following spring.

References

External links

2003 births
Living people
Argentine footballers
Association football forwards
People from General López Department
Rosario Central footballers
Argentine Primera División players